Guzmania megastachya is a species of plant in the genus Guzmania. It is an epiphyte and is a part of the family Bromeliaceae.

References

megastachya
Taxa named by Carl Christian Mez
Taxa named by John Gilbert Baker